Top of the Food Chain is a 1999 Canadian comedy-horror film directed by John Paizs and starring Campbell Scott, Fiona Loewi, and Tom Everett Scott.  A parody of alien invasion movies of the 1950s, it was released on video in the United States under the title Invasion!

The film revolves around a vacationing atomic scientist who encounters mysterious carnivorous beings disguised as traveling salesmen who are feeding on the eccentric population of the small isolated town of Exceptional Vista.

References

External links

1999 films
English-language Canadian films
Canadian science fiction comedy films
1990s parody films
1990s science fiction comedy films
1990s science fiction horror films
1990s comedy horror films
Canadian comedy horror films
1999 comedy films
1990s English-language films
1990s Canadian films